Trentepohlia  may refer to:
 Trentepohlia (alga),  a genus of algae in the family  Trentepohliaceae
 Trentepohlia (fly), a genus of crane fly in the family Limoniidae